Conyers is an international law firm. Their client base includes FTSE 100 and Fortune 500 companies, international finance houses and asset managers. The firm advises on law practiced in Bermuda, British Virgin Islands and the Cayman Islands. Conyers Headquarters is situated in Hamilton, Bermuda and has international offices in Hong Kong, London and Singapore. Conyers also provides several corporate, trust, compliance, governance and accounting and management services.

History 
Founded in Bermuda in 1928 (although it can trace its roots back to 1903), the firm has subsequently opened legal practices in a number of other offshore financial centres, including the British Virgin Islands (1996) and the Cayman Islands (2004). It also has offices in key financial centres, including London (1998), Hong Kong (1985) and Singapore (2001). It is a member of the offshore magic circle. Conyers' expansion has been entirely by way of organic growth, rather than by acquisition of smaller firms in jurisdictions it wishes to operate in. The firm can claim to be the first offshore firm to operate in multiple jurisdictions; the original Bermudian firm opened a British Virgin Islands office in 1996.

The firm's founder, Reginald Conyers, played an important role in the development of the nascent financial services industry in Bermuda in the 1920s and 1930s. Following on from the Bermuda Railway Company Act 1924, Conyers faced a legal problem of conveying huge numbers of land parcels by the company. Firstly, he took on two partners in his practice, Bayard Dill and James Pearman (and thus the firm was officially born).  Secondly, in 1935 the firm was instrumental in the enactment of the first "exempt company" legislation in Bermuda, which leads some to claim that Bermuda was the world's first offshore financial centre. Later, in 1957, another partner of the firm, David Graham, laid the basis for the development of Bermuda as a domicile for ship registrations in a letter to The Times. In 2019, the firm became the subject of the Mauritius Leaks and related investigations carried forth by the International Consortium of Investigative Journalists and its partners.

Practice areas 
Conyers offers legal and client services in areas including corporate, banking & finance, insurance & reinsurance, investment funds, private client & trust, litigation & restructuring and real estate & property development.

Awards and accolades 
Conyers is a member of Lex Mundi, a large association of independent law firms.

Conyers was recognised as Band 1 by Chambers & Partners in 2018.

Conyers was recognised as a Top Tier Firm by IFLR1000 for 2018, and by Legal 500 Caribbean 2018.

References

External links
 Firm's official site
 Lex Mundi website 

Offshore law firms
Law firms established in 1928
Offshore magic circle
Companies of Bermuda
1928 establishments in Bermuda
Dill family